Kuromido (Japanese: 黒味銅) is an historically Japanese copper alloy, typically of 99% copper and 1% metallic arsenic, one of the class of irogane metals.

It is used in the production of other alloys, and in decorative fittings, as well as in mokume-gane processes.

See also
 Shakudō
 Shibuichi
 Corinthian bronze and hepatizon (Black bronze)
 Electrum
 Orichalcum
 Panchaloha
 Tumbaga

External sources

References

Irogane
Copper alloys
Arsenic